Nehru Institute of Information Technology and Management (NIITM) is one of the self-financing engineering colleges Affiliated to Anna University Tamil Nadu and approved by AICTE.

History

It is located in Thirumalayampalayam, Coimbatore. The college is certified ISO 9001:2000 by the International Certification Services.

Courses offered

List of Courses offered 

 M.B.A. Master of Business Administration 
 M.C.A. Master of Computer Applications

Facilities

 Laboratory Facilities
 Hostel Facilities

References

External links
 Website

Engineering colleges in Tamil Nadu
Business schools in Tamil Nadu
Colleges affiliated to Anna University
Education in Coimbatore district
Educational institutions established in 2006
2006 establishments in Tamil Nadu